William K. Wilson (1817, Hamilton, Scotland – 26 December 1898, Wauwatosa, Wisconsin) was an American harness merchant who served as a member of the Wisconsin State Assembly and the Wisconsin State Senate. Wilson was a member of the Assembly in 1851 and of the Senate from 1863 to 1866. He was a Democrat.

References

1817 births
1898 deaths
Democratic Party members of the Wisconsin State Assembly
Politicians from Hamilton, South Lanarkshire
Scottish emigrants to the United States
Democratic Party Wisconsin state senators
19th-century American politicians
Businesspeople from Milwaukee